Syed Saad Ali (born 5 October 1993) is a Pakistani cricketer who plays for Lahore Qalandars in the Pakistan Super League (PSL) and for Sindh in the Pakistan domestic tournaments. He made his international debut for the Pakistan cricket team in March 2019.

Domestic career
He made his Twenty20 debut for Islamabad in the 2017–18 National T20 Cup on 12 November 2017. In November 2017, he was selected to play for the Quetta Gladiators in 2018 Pakistan Super League players draft.

He was the leading run-scorer in the 2017–18 Quaid-e-Azam Trophy, with a total of 957 runs in ten matches, more than 200 runs ahead of the next leading batsman in the tournament. He was also the leading run-scorer for Karachi Whites in the 2018–19 Quaid-e-Azam One Day Cup, with 243 runs in five matches. He was also the leading run-scorer for Peshawar in the 2018–19 National T20 Cup, with 183 runs in four matches.

In March 2019, he was named in Punjab's squad for the 2019 Pakistan Cup. In September 2019, he was named in Sindh's squad for the 2019–20 Quaid-e-Azam Trophy tournament. In March 2021, Saad was signed by Longton Cricket Club to play in the North Staffordshire and South Cheshire League during the summer of 2021 in England.

International career
In April 2018, he was named in Pakistan's Test squad for their tours to Ireland and England in May 2018, but he did not play. In August 2018, he was one of thirty-three players to be awarded a central contract for the 2018–19 season by the Pakistan Cricket Board (PCB).

In November 2018, he was again named in Pakistan's Test squad, this time for their series against New Zealand. In December 2018, he was named in Pakistan's team for the 2018 ACC Emerging Teams Asia Cup.

In March 2019, he was named in Pakistan's One Day International (ODI) squad for their series against Australia. He made his ODI debut for Pakistan against Australia on 29 March 2019.

References

External links
 

1993 births
Living people
Pakistani cricketers
Pakistan One Day International cricketers
Baluchistan cricketers
Karachi cricketers
Karachi Whites cricketers
Islamabad cricketers
Cricketers from Karachi
Quetta Gladiators cricketers
Lahore Qalandars cricketers
Peshawar cricketers